My Diarrhe is a book by Colleen Ballinger, released July 10, 2018 by Gallery Books, an imprint of Simon and Schuster. It consists of supposedly leaked diaries written in the voice of the comic character Miranda Sings, which is created and performed by Ballinger.

The book debuted at no. 8 on The New York Times list of bestsellers (Advice, How To- & Miscellaneous category) a week after it premiered. The book got a review of 4.5/5 stars on Apple Books and 4/5 stars on Google Books. Reviewers on Goodreads found the book "super quick but good nonetheless" and "full of photos and funny little notes about her childhood".

References 

2018 books
American books
Books by YouTubers
Parody books
Gallery Books books